Gia Gunn is the stage name of American drag performer Gia Keitaro Ichikawa (born May 10, 1990). She is known for competing on the sixth season of RuPaul's Drag Race, the second season of The Switch Drag Race, and RuPaul's Drag Race: All Stars season four.

Early life 
Gunn began performing Japanese traditional dance and kabuki in onnagata roles when she was five years old.

She graduated from Barrington High School in Barrington, Illinois.

She won the drag pageants Miss Roscoe's 2013 and Miss Diosa 2013. Her drag mother is trans drag performer Aly Gunn. Their last name inspired by Tim Gunn; Gia's first name came from Gia Carangi.

Career

Drag Race and The Switch

Gunn was announced as one of fourteen contestants for the sixth season of RuPaul's Drag Race on February 24, 2014. She covered RuPaul's song "Ladyboy" for RuPaul's album RuPaul Presents: The CoverGurlz to promote the season. On the show, she was known for her voguing, off-the-cuff catchphrases, reads and particular opinions, feminine style of drag, and friendship with fellow contestant Laganja Estranja. She underperformed as Kim Kardashian during the "Snatch Game" challenge, and was eliminated after losing a bottom two lip sync against Estranja to Lisa Lisa & Cult Jam's "Head to Toe," earning her tenth place.

In 2017, Gunn was announced as a contestant on the second season of The Switch, the Chilean version of Drag Race, alongside Drag Race alumnus Kandy Ho. The series premiered March 25, 2018 with 15 contestants, including the winner of the first season. She earned ten challenge wins, making her the most-decorated contestant of the season, but lost to Miss Leona.

Gunn was announced as one of ten contestants competing on RuPaul's Drag Race: All-Stars Season Four on November 9, 2018. Gia became the third ever transgender contestant to come out prior to appearing on the show, following Monica Beverly Hillz and Peppermint. However, Gia was the first trans contestant to compete post-transition during her second season. The show premiered on December 14, 2018, with Gunn eliminated in the third episode after once again underperforming in "Snatch Game" challenge with her Jenny Bui impression. Manila Luzon eliminated her, causing Gunn to place 8th. She had a chance to return in the sixth episode, where the eliminated queens faced off with the queens still in game, but lost a lip sync to Naomi Smalls, eliminating her for good.

After her elimination Gunn sparked controversy revealing that an altercation between her and RuPaul about transgender drag queens was edited out of show.

After Drag Race
Gunn walked the runway for MarcoMarco's fall 2017 fashion show with other Drag Race alumni.

On March 31, 2018, Gunn released 30 Days in Transition, a web series on her YouTube channel documenting aspects of her transition as a transgender woman. Shortly thereafter, she was announced to star in the first episode of an internet documentary series by WOWPresents following her life as a trans person and drag queen; the series will be called Follow Me. A teaser was released on June 25, 2018, and features Isis King.

With WOW Presents, she played Karrueche Tran's character Virginia in a recap video of the first season of Claws. Gunn also frequently appeared in other WOW Presents productions, including Wait, What?, Besties for Cash, and Fashion Photo Ruview. She and Estranja appear both on WOW Presents and at other performances as the duo TeamTooMuch.

Music
Following her appearance on RuPaul's Drag Race, Gunn released her first solo single "Bring out the Gunnz" on July 31, 2015.

In 2016, Gunn was featured on the Alaska's song "Stun" from her album Poundcake. A music video was released on April 24, 2017. Drag Race contestants Mariah Paris Balenciaga, Courtney Act and Willam are featured in the video as well.

On August 29, 2018, Gunn's second single "#LaChinaMasLatina" was released, featuring Alaska. She and Estranja appeared in the music video for Danielle Alexa's "Spin in Circles."

Personal life 
Ichikawa started taking hormones in 2016, and she publicly came out as a transgender woman via Instagram in April 2017. She later had the first name on her birth certificate officially changed to Gia in August. She was one of many Drag Race alumni to criticize RuPaul's views on transgender and bio queens competing on the show in 2018. She started a Gofundme page to cover $30,000 of her transition surgery.

Gia sparked controversy in June 2020, claiming that the COVID-19 pandemic was a hoax, saying in an Instagram Live video, “I think the whole mask thing is f–king ridiculous... I honestly think this whole COVID-19 thing is a hoax.” She later tested positive for COVID-19 in July 2021, receiving further backlash from fellow season 6 contestant and winner, Bianca Del Rio, as well as season 7 contestant, Mrs. Kasha Davis. 

She is a member of the drag family The Haus of Edwards, with Alyssa Edwards, Shangela, Plastique Tiara, Laganja Estranja and Vivienne Pinay.

Filmography

Television

Music videos

Web series

Discography

Singles

References

External links

 
 

20th-century births
Year of birth missing (living people)
Living people
Asian-American drag queens
LGBT people from Illinois
American LGBT people of Asian descent
People from Carpentersville, Illinois
People from Chicago
Gia Gunn
Gia Gunn
Transgender women
Transgender drag performers
Transgender rights activists
American women singers
American LGBT musicians
American musicians of Japanese descent
The Switch Drag Race